The Barnsley Coal Railway was a short railway which, when fully opened, ran between Stairfoot Junction, on the Mexborough to Barnsley line of the South Yorkshire Railway (SYR) and a triangular junction at Nostell on the line of the West Riding and Grimsby Railway (WR&GR).

The railway rights were purchased by the SYR in July 1863, just one year before that company was absorbed into the Manchester, Sheffield and Lincolnshire Railway.

Scheduled passenger services on the lined ended in 1930, and goods services in 1961.

History

In the parliamentary session of 1860/1 an act was applied for to incorporate a company, and construct a line from a junction with the South Yorkshire Railway (SYR) west of Ardsley railway station to Crigglestone. An act was passed in 1861, allowing the creation of the Barnsley Coal Railway, with £40,000 of capital allowed to be raised by share issue, and £13,000 by loans.

In 1863 an act was passed allowing the South Yorkshire Railway, which had subscribed £10,000 of the railway's capital, to take over the company.

In 1864 an act was obtained allowing a short  extension to the Midland Railway's line near Barnsley; the new chord would have enabled the South Yorkshire company to take advantage of their recently acquired running powers to Wakefield and Leeds over the Midland's lines. This connecting line was not built.

The first section line served Rosa Colliery, and opened to traffic in January 1870.

In the session of 1873/4 the SYR's successor the Manchester, Sheffield and Lincolnshire Railway (MS&LR) obtained powers to build an extension from near the 1860s terminus at Notton, to a two way junction with the West Riding and Grimsby Railway north-west of Nostel station; also sought were powers for a junction from the line to the Midland's line near to the Barnsley Canal; and a second junction from Coal railway to SYR's Barnsley line, creating an extended triangular junction to that line.

The second section was opened for goods traffic in August 1882. This section ran from Applehaigh to a triangular junction with the West Riding and Grimsby Railway (WR&GR) at Nostell. The line included passenger stations at Staincross and Mapplewell, Notton and Royston and Ryhill, later renamed Ryhill and Wintersett. A passenger service commenced on 1 September 1882.

Regular passenger services were withdrawn in 1930, goods services in 1961.

Train services
The passenger service on the line was part of a Leeds (Central) / Barnsley (Court House) service via Wakefield (Westgate). The July 1922 issue of Bradshaw's Railway Guide shows 5 trains in each direction on Mondays to Fridays, 6 trains on Saturday from Barnsley to Leeds and 7 on Saturday from Leeds to Barnsley. There was no Sunday service.

Notes

References

Sources

External links

South Yorkshire Railway
Early British railway companies
Mining railways
Rail transport in South Yorkshire
Companies based in Barnsley
Railway companies established in 1863
Railway lines opened in 1882
Coal in England